The 1979 Washington State Cougars football team was an American football team that represented Washington State University in the Pacific-10 Conference (Pac-10) during the 1979 NCAA Division I-A football season. In their second season under head coach Jim Walden, the Cougars compiled a 3–8 record (2–6 in Pac-10, ninth), and were outscored 366 to 241.

The team's statistical leaders included Steve Grant with 1,565 passing yards, Tali Ena with 844 rushing yards, and Jim Whatley with 513 receiving yards.

Martin Stadium's seating capacity was increased over the summer (track removed, field lowered) and hosted its first game of the season in mid-October for homecoming.  upset of UCLA was the Cougars' first win over the Bruins 

The traditional Battle of the Palouse game with neighbor Idaho went on hiatus beginning with this season (the Vandals had moved down to Division I-AA in 1978); it was played in 1982 and 1989. When Idaho rejoined Division I-A, there was a ten-year resumption (1998–2007).

Schedule

Roster

Fallen teammate
During an evening practice on August 22, senior defensive tackle Hayward "Spud" Harris of Tacoma collapsed during a non-contact drill. He could not be revived by the training staff, was rushed by ambulance to Pullman Memorial Hospital, and was pronounced dead an hour after arrival.

Season summary

UCLA
On homecoming weekend, Mike Snow blocked two field goals and deflected a pass in the end zone as Washington State upset UCLA 17–14 in front of a record home crowd in the newly-expanded Martin Stadium. Brian Sickler capped an 84-yard fourth quarter drive with a one-yard plunge as the Cougars rallied from a 7–14 halftime deficit.

Senior safety Don McCall recorded two interceptions, seven tackles, and a fumble recovery.

NFL Draft
Four Cougars were selected in the 1980 NFL Draft.

References

External links
 Game program: Arizona vs. WSU at Spokane – September 8, 1979
 Game program: UCLA at WSU – October 13, 1979
 Game program: California at WSU – November 10, 1979

Washington State
Washington State Cougars football seasons
Washington State Cougars football